The Halki seminary, formally the Theological School of Halki ( and ), was founded on 1 October 1844 on the island of Halki (Turkish: Heybeliada), the second-largest of the Princes' Islands in the Sea of Marmara. It was the main school of theology of the Eastern Orthodox Church's Ecumenical Patriarchate of Constantinople until the Turkish parliament enacted a law banning private higher education institutions in 1971. The theological school is located at the top of the island's Hill of Hope, on the site of the Byzantine-era Monastery of the Holy Trinity. The premises of the school continue to be maintained by the monastery and are used to host conferences. It is possible to visit the island where it is located via boat in approximately one hour from the shore of Istanbul. An international campaign to reopen this theological school is ongoing.

History
The seminary is located on the site of the Monastery of the Holy Trinity, founded by Patriarch Photius I almost a thousand years before the foundation of the theological school. During Ottoman rule the monastery fell into disrepair. In 1844, Patriarch Germanos IV converted the monastery into a school of theology, which was inaugurated on 1 October 1844. All the buildings, except for the 17th-century chapel, were destroyed by the 1894 Istanbul earthquake, but were rebuilt by architect Periklis Fotiadis and inaugurated on 6 October 1896. These buildings were also renovated in the 1950s.

When established in 1844, the school had seven grades, four high school level and three higher level (theological grades). In 1899, the high school division was dissolved and the school functioned as an academy with five grades. In 1923, on the establishment of the Turkish Republic, the seven-grade system was restored (4 high school + 3 higher level). In 1951, it was changed to 3 high school + 4 higher level.

The facilities include the Chapel of the Holy Trinity, sports and recreational institutions, dormitories, an infirmary, a hospice, offices, and the school's library with its historic collection of books, journals, and manuscripts. The library contains over 120,000 books.

There have been 990 graduates of the theological school and many have become priests, bishops, archbishops, scholars, and patriarchs. Many former students are buried in the grounds of the school. Orthodox Christians from around the world have attended and graduated from the theological school and the alumni are distributed around the world.

Enforced closure
In 1971, parts of the Private University Law were ruled unconstitutional by the Constitutional Court of Turkey, which ruled that all private colleges must be affiliated with a state-run university; subsequently all private institutions of higher education either became part of state universities or closed down. It was stated in Article 130 of the Turkish Constitution of 1961 that:

However, Article 132 stated that:

The seminary section of the Halki school was closed down and although the high school remains open the Turkish government no longer permits students to attend it. The school is currently only used for conferences, including the International Environmental Symposium.

On 2 November 1998, Halki's Board of Trustees were ordered to disband by an agency of the Turkish government. International criticism caused the order to be rescinded on 25 November 1998.

Risks to the Seminary

In November 2007, the 17th-century Chapel of Our Lord's Transfiguration at the Halki seminary, which had survived the June 1894 earthquake, was almost totally demolished by Forest Guards of the Turkish forestry authority. There was no advance warning given for the demolition work, organised by the Turkish government, and it was only stopped after appeals by the Ecumenical Patriarch.

Campaign to reopen the seminary
The Halki seminary has received international attention in recent years. In October 1998, both houses of the United States Congress passed resolutions that supported the reopening of Halki. The European Union has also raised the issue as part of its negotiations over Turkish accession to the EU. US President Bill Clinton visited Halki on his visit to Turkey in 1999 and urged Turkish President Süleyman Demirel to allow the reopening of the school.

In a speech before the Turkish Parliament on 6 April 2009, US President Barack Obama re-affirmed the need for Turkey to allow the re-opening of the Halki seminary:

These sentiments were echoed by US Secretary of State Hillary Clinton at a dinner in Washington honoring their guest, Ecumenical Patriarch Bartholomew I.

Commentators have noted that while the Turkish government may outwardly seem willing to reopen the seminary, actual moves to do so are not underway because of internal political obstacles. Arrangements for reopening necessitate constitutional amendments, which may be used as a tool by opposition parties to fuel nationalist rhetoric.

In 2010, a journalist of the Turkish newspaper Today's Zaman asked officials at the Ecumenical Patriarchate if there were any plans to take the issue to the European Court of Human Rights. Patriarchate officials responded that they did not want to pursue that course of action. However, Patriarch Bartholomew has indicated that they may well have to if there is no progress towards the re-opening of the theological school.

In March 2012, a meeting occurred in South Korea between Prime Minister Erdoğan of Turkey, and President Barack Obama of the United States. In this meeting, Prime Minister Erdoğan indicated to President Obama that Halki Seminary would be reopened as part of Turkey's efforts to protect religious minorities.

In January 2013, the Turkish newspaper Today's Zaman published news that the Council of Foundations returned 190 hectares (470 acres) to the Aya Triada Monastery Foundation, which is the owner of Halki Seminary. At the time, this was the largest return of immovable property to a minority within the Turkish nation. Most of the property which was returned included forested land around the seminary.

After a meeting with Erdoğan and foreign minister Mevlüt Çavuşoğlu on 25 April 2018, Patriarch Bartholomew said that he was "optimistic" after both Erdogan and Cavusoglu "assured him that the School would soon reopen". In February 2019, for the first time, Greek Prime Minister Alexis Tsipras visited Halki during his visit to Turkey and urged Erdoğan to allow the reopening of the school. Tsipras also suggested the next time they should visit the Halki seminary together.

Alumni
In the history of the theological school there have been 990 graduates in total. The alumni include:
Saint Chrysostomos of Smyrna
Saint Raphael of Brooklyn
Anthim I of Bulgaria
Ecumenical Patriarch Bartholomew I of Constantinople
Ecumenical Patriarch Demetrios I of Constantinople
Ecumenical Patriarch Athenagoras I of Constantinople
Ecumenical Patriarch Constantine VI of Constantinople
Ecumenical Patriarch Germanus V of Constantinople
Ecumenical Patriarch Maximus V of Constantinople
Patriarch Parthenius III of Alexandria
Archbishop Chrysanthus of Athens
Archbishop Spyridon of Athens
Archbishop Spyridon of America
Archbishop Michael of America
Archbishop Iakovos of America
Archbishop Stylianos of Australia and Exarch of Oceania
Cornelius of Petra
Christoforos Knitis
Makarios II
Ioakeim Martianos
Meliton, Metropolitan of Chalcedon
Metropolitan Nikiforos of Didymoteicho, Orestiada and Soufli
Metropolitan Panteleimon of Belgium
Theophylactos Papathanasopoulos
Panteleimon Kotokos

See also
Byzantine philosophy
Essence–Energies distinction (Eastern Orthodox theology)
Philotheos Bryennios

References

External links

 Official website of the Theological School of Halki 
 A history of the seminary

Educational institutions established in 1844
Eastern Orthodox seminaries
Seminaries and theological colleges in Turkey
Ecumenical Patriarchate of Constantinople
Greeks in Turkey
Persecution of Greeks in Turkey
Universities and colleges in Istanbul
Islands of the Sea of Marmara
Greece–Turkey relations
Discrimination in Turkey